The North West Hockey League was an ice hockey minor league with teams in the western United States and western Canada that existed from 1933 to 1936. It was formed from the Calgary and Vancouver franchises of the Western Canada Hockey League and three new teams.

The league lasted for three seasons, after which the Portland, Vancouver, and Seattle franchises left to form a reconstituted Pacific Coast Hockey League.

Teams
Calgary Tigers
Edmonton Eskimos
Portland Buckaroos
Seattle Sea Hawks
Vancouver Lions

Champions
1934: Calgary Tigers
1935: Vancouver Lions
1936: Seattle Sea Hawks

External links
 League stats from hockeydb.com
 History of North American Hockey Leagues

Defunct ice hockey leagues in the United States
Defunct ice hockey leagues in Canada
1933–34 in American ice hockey by league
1934–35 in American ice hockey by league
1935–36 in American ice hockey by league
1933–34 in Canadian ice hockey by league
1934–35 in Canadian ice hockey by league
1935–36 in Canadian ice hockey by league